Green Cay is an uninhabited island of the British Virgin Islands in the Caribbean. It sits between the eastern tip of Little Jost Van Dyke and Tortola.

Environment
The island, with its surrounding waters, has been designated an Important Bird Area (IBA) by BirdLife International because it supports a large nesting colony of roseate terns. The island also provides habitat for the Puerto Rican racer (Alsophis portoricensis), the crested anole (Anolis cristatellus wileyae), and the big-scaled least gecko (Sphaerodactylus macrolepis macrolepis).

References

Uninhabited islands of the British Virgin Islands
Important Bird Areas of the British Virgin Islands
Seabird colonies